Prudence is a feminine given name. The name is a Medieval form of the Latin Prudentia, meaning prudence, i.e. good judgment. 

The usual diminutive or short form is Pru or Prue. These may also be short for the unrelated name Prunella, which means plum.

People with this name

 Prudence Farrow, was John Lennon's inspiration for the Beatles' song Dear Prudence
 Pru Goward, member of the New South Wales Legislative Assembly
 Prue Leith, British television cook
 Prudence Liew, Hong Kong-based cantopop singer and actress
 Prudence Millinery, London based, milliner and hat designer
 Prudence McIntyre, the younger sister of the sister duo Patience & Prudence
 Prudence Neff, American pianist and music teacher
 Prue Sibree, former member of the Victorian Legislative Assembly

Fictional characters
Prudence Brown, a first form girl and the main antagonist of the book Summer Term at St. Clare's by Enid Blyton.
Prudence Palfrey, from the 1874 novel of the same name by Thomas Bailey Aldrich.
Prudence Courteney, the charming and unfortunate heroine of Evelyn Waugh's 1931 novel Black Mischief.
Prudence, a character from the 2007 film Across the Universe
Prudence, English dub name for Ryusuke Minami's first guitar in the anime adaptation of BECK
Prudence, voiced by Holland Taylor, a Disney character who appears in Cinderella II, Cinderella III: A Twist in Time, and Twice Charmed, as well as other Disney continuations of the Cinderella story. She is the majordomo of Cinderella's castle, as well as the love interest of the Grand Duke
Prudence, a bullying toddler in the Rugrats episode "Showdown At Teeter-Totter Gulch"
Prudence Bates, a 29-year-old spinster who works for a "vague cultural organisation" and keeps in touch with her best friend from Oxford, vicar's wife Jane Cleveland: together the heroines of Barbara Pym's eponymous 1953 novel Jane and Prudence 
Prudence Bell, the female lead in Rome Adventure, a 1960s love story with Troy Donahue and Suzanne Pleshette
Prudence Blackwood, portrayed by Tati Gabrielle on the TV series Chilling Adventures of Sabrina
Prudence Duncan, the middle sister in the Matchmaker triad of books by Jane Feather
Prudence Everett (played by Kim Richards), the youngest daughter of Prof. Harold Everett in the 1970-71 American TV program Nanny and the Professor
Prue Halliwell, portrayed by Shannen Doherty, one of the lead characters on the TV show Charmed until her death at the end of the third season 
 Prudence Harbinger, a fictional character created by Laurence Marks and Maurice Gran. She is the new UK Prime Minister's Director of Media Liaison. Her diary has been serialised in the Sunday Telegraph, the first episode appearing on 10 May 2007
 Prudence King, main character of Love Lessons, a novel by Children's Laureate, Jacqueline Wilson
 Prudence McLeod, the mother of the main character Claire McLeod on the TV show McLeod's Daughters

Feminine given names
Virtue names